The 2003–04 United Counties League season was the 97th in the history of the United Counties League, a football competition in England.

Premier Division

The Premier Division featured 20 clubs which competed in the division last season, along with two new clubs:
Harrowby United, promoted from Division One
Spalding United, relegated from the Southern Football League

League table

Division One

Division One featured 15 clubs which competed in the division last season, along with three new clubs:
Kempston Rovers, relegated from the Premier Division
Eye United, joined from the Peterborough and District League
Huntingdon Town, joined from the Cambridgeshire League

League table

References

External links
 United Counties League

2003–04 in English football leagues
United Counties League seasons